Carl-Erik von Braun (14 November 1896 – 2 November 1981) was a Swedish tennis player who was active in the 1920s.

Tennis career
Von Braun competed at the Wimbledon Championships between 1920 and 1925. Hist best singles result was reaching the third round in 1922 (lost to H.R. Fussell) and 1925 (lost to Raymond Casey). His best doubles result was at his first appearance in 1920 when he reached the third round partnering compatriot Sune Malmström.

Von Braun was a member of the Swedish Davis Cup team who played against The Netherlands during the 1925 Davis Cup competition. The match was played on clay courts in Noordwijk, Netherlands and Von Braun lost his singles matches, against Henk Timmer and Arthur Diemer Kool, in straight sets as well as his doubles match partnering Marcus Wallenberg.

He competed in the singles and doubles events at the 1920 Summer Olympics in Antwerp. In the singles event he reached the second round in which he was defeated by Albert Lammens. With compatriot Sune Malmström he lost in the first round of the doubles event against Jean Washer and Albert Lammens.

See also
List of Sweden Davis Cup team representatives

References

External links
 
 

1896 births
1981 deaths
Swedish male tennis players
Olympic tennis players of Sweden
Tennis players at the 1920 Summer Olympics
Tennis players from Stockholm